The 1984 New Mexico Lobos football team was an American football team that represented the University of New Mexico in the Western Athletic Conference (WAC) during the 1984 NCAA Division I-A football season.  In their second season under head coach Joe Lee Dunn, the Lobos compiled a 4–8 record (1–7 against WAC opponents) and were outscored by a total of 359 to 251. 

The team's statistical leaders included Buddy Funck with 922 passing yards, Willie Turral with 1,064 rushing yards and 60 points scored, and Kenneth Whitehead with 713 receiving yards.

Schedule

References

New Mexico
New Mexico Lobos football seasons
New Mexico Lobos football